José Pérez Flores (October 21, 1910 – August 27, 1994) was a Mexican professional boxer better known as Battling Shaw or Benny Kid Roy. He was the first Mexican to become world champion.

Professional career 
Shaw made his pro debut at the age of 16. He mostly fought out of Louisiana. He became the World Light Welterweight Champion after decisioning Johnny Jadick in 1933. He also fought fellow Mexican fighter and hall of fame Kid Azteca, although the exact date is unknown (Herbert Goldman's boxing encyclopedia dates the bouts as taking place in July and August 1931, but without any day numbers given; Shaw lost both bouts on points in ten rounds). He was trained and managed by Emile Bruneau (WBA President '62-66).

Professional boxing record
All information in this section is derived from BoxRec, unless otherwise stated.

Official record

All newspaper decisions are officially regarded as “no decision” bouts and are not counted in the win/loss/draw column.

Unofficial record

Record with the inclusion of newspaper decision in the win/loss/draw column.

See also 
List of light welterweight boxing champions
List of Mexican boxing world champions

References

External links 

Article on Shaw at age 80
Battling Shaw - CBZ Profile

1910 births
1994 deaths
Light-welterweight boxers
Boxers from Tamaulipas
Sportspeople from Nuevo Laredo
World boxing champions
Mexican male boxers